The Ford Motor Company built two models of 	60° V4 engine in Europe:
 Ford Taunus V4 engine, 1962–1981, built in Germany
 later developed into the  Ford Cologne V6 engine
 Ford Essex V4 engine, 1965–1977, built in England
 later developed into the Ford Essex V6 engine (UK)

V4
Ford
Gasoline engines by model